Panther Falls is the first of two waterfalls on the Angel Falls Trail in Rabun County, Georgia.  The second waterfall on the trail is Angel Falls. The falls are each about 50' in height on Joe Branch Creek. The trail begins at the Rabun Beach Camping Area #2 and is a moderately strenuous 0.5 mile hike to Panther Falls with Angel Falls and additional 0.5 mile.

References

Waterfalls of Georgia (U.S. state)
Waterfalls of Rabun County, Georgia